Man in a Hurry (released in UK as The Hurried Man) is a 1977 French-Italian drama film directed by Édouard Molinaro and starring Alain Delon and Mireille Darc. It is based on the novel The Man in a Hurry by Paul Morand. It recorded admissions of 730,581 in France.

Plot

Cast 

 Alain Delon as Pierre Niox 
 Mireille Darc as Edwige de Bois-Rosé 
 Michel Duchaussoy as Placide Justin
 Monica Guerritore  as Marie de Bois-Rosé
 Marie Déa as  Madame de Bois-Rosé
  Billy Kearns as Freeman
 André Falcon as  Maurice
  Marco Perrin as Sirielle
  Stefano Patrizi as  Vivien
  Muriel Catala as  Katia
 Pierre Saintons as  The African Minister
  Doura Mané as  André Dubois
 Daniel Kamwa as  The African Director  
 Felice Andreasi as   Daniela Hotel Receptionist
 André Dumas as Restaurant Manager
 Lyne Chardonnet as  Air Hostess
 Geoffrey Carey as  The Decorator
  Jacques Pisias as  Dutertre 
  Philippe Brigaud as  Michel 
 Dominique Zardi  as  Julien 
 Philippe Castelli  as  Philippe
 Henri Attal  as Auction House's Employee

References

External links

Italian adventure films
French adventure films
1970s adventure films
Films based on works by Paul Morand
Films directed by Édouard Molinaro
Films produced by Alain Delon
Films scored by Carlo Rustichelli
1970s French films
1970s Italian films